The 2002 Lithuanian Athletics Championships were held at the S. Darius and S. Girėnas Stadium in Kaunas on August 13 and August 14, 2002.

Men

Women

Medals by city

External links
 Lithuanian athletics

Lithuanian Athletics Championships
Lithuanian Athletics Championships, 2002
Lithuanian Athletics Championships